Goniodoris meracula is a species of sea slug, a dorid nudibranch, a marine gastropod mollusc in the family Goniodorididae.

Distribution
This species was first described from Victoria, south-eastern Australia. It is found from Pearson Island, South Australia to the mid New South Wales coast, from intertidal to 65 m depth.

Description
This goniodorid nudibranch is translucent grey in colour, with spots and patches of white and brown surface pigment.

Ecology
Goniodoris meracula feeds on colonial ascidians into which it eats cavities within which it is often hidden.

References

Goniodorididae
Gastropods described in 1958